The Slovenská hokejová liga (Slovak Hockey League) is a professional ice hockey league composed of ten (plus one) teams in Slovakia. It is the second-level ice hockey league in Slovakia.

Game

Each regular season Slovenská hokejová liga game is composed of three 20-minute periods, with an intermission of a maximum of 18 minutes between periods. If the game is tied following the 60-minute regulation time, a five-minute three-on-three sudden death overtime period is played.  If a game still is tied after the overtime period, a shootout decides the game. In a shootout, the team that scores the most penalty shots out of five attempts wins the game. If the game is still tied after the first five penalty-shot rounds, the shootout continues round by round, until one team scores while the other team fails to score.

Teams
Thirteen clubs play in the 2021–22 Slovak 1. Liga season.

2021–22 season

Previous winners

Slovak 1. Liga Champions

1994 – HK Spartak Dubnica nad Váhom
1995 – ŠK Iskra Banská Bystrica
1996 – HK VTJ Spišská Nová Ves
1997 – HKm Zvolen
1998 – ŠK Iskra Banská Bystrica
1999 – HK Spartak Dubnica nad Váhom
2000 – HC Martimex ZŤS Martin
2001 – MsHK ŠKP Žilina
2002 – HK VTJ Spišská Nová Ves
2003  – MHC Nitra
2004 – HK Dubnica nad Váhom
2005 – HKm Detva
2006 – HC '05 Banská Bystrica
2007 – MHK SkiPark Kežmarok
2008 – HC '05 Banská Bystrica
2009 – HK Spišská Nová Ves
2010 – ŠHK 37 Piešťany
2011 – ŠHK 37 Piešťany
2012 – HC 46 Bardejov
2013 – HC 46 Bardejov
2014 – HC 46 Bardejov
2015 – HC 07 Detva
2016 – HC Nové Zámky
2017 – HC 07 Orin Detva
2018 – HK Dukla Ingema Michalovce
2019 – HK Dukla Ingema Michalovce
2020 – Not held due to COVID-19 pandemic in Slovakia
2021 – HK Spišská Nová Ves
2022 – Vlci Žilina

See also
 Slovak Extraliga
 2. liga

References

External links
SZĽH – Slovak Ice-Hockey Federation 
 – 1. Hokejova liga statistics 
EliteProspects.com: Slovak 1.liga standings

 
Slov
Professional ice hockey leagues in Slovakia
Multi-national ice hockey leagues in Europe
Multi-national professional sports leagues